Mucor ellipsoideus is a fungus first isolated from human clinical specimens in the US. M. ellipsoideus is able to grow and sporulate at 37 °C like closely related M. indicus, but the former has narrow ellipsoidal sporangiospores, as compared to the subglobose to ellipsoidal sporangiospores of the latter.

References

Further reading
Calvano, Tatjana P., et al. "Pythium aphanidermatum infection following combat trauma." Journal of Clinical Microbiology 49.10 (2011): 3710–3713.

External links

MycoBank

Mucoraceae
Fungi described in 2010